Banzai may refer to:

 A traditional Japanese exclamation meaning "ten thousand years" of long life.

Arts and entertainment

Music
 Banzai, a French disco group; see Euro disco 
 Banzai! (album), a 1991 album by Tigertailz
 "Banzai" (Kaela Kimura song)
 Bonnie Banzai, guitar player and singer in Swedish punkband Asta Kask
 Banzai (album), a 2017 album by Gata Cattana

Film and television
 Banzaï, a 1983 French film
 Banzai (1918 film), an American film
 Banzai (1997 film), an Italian film
 Banzai (G.I. Joe), a fictional character in the G.I. Joe universe
 Banzai (TV series), a spoof of Japanese gameshows
 Banzai (The Lion King), a hyena character from the 1994 Disney animated film The Lion King

Other uses in arts and entertainment
 The Banzai Drop, a variation of the Seated senton professional wrestling move
 Banzai! (magazine), the German edition of the Weekly Shōnen Jump manga magazine
 Anime Banzai, an anime convention in Utah, United States

People with the surname
, Japanese general
Dr. Buckaroo Banzai, a fictional movie character

Other uses
 Banzai, Fujian, a town in Pinghe County, Fujian, China
 Banzai charge or banzai attack, a last, desperate military charge
 Banzai Cliff, one of the sites of mass Japanese suicide on the island of Saipan during World War II
 Banzai skydive, the act of throwing a parachute out of a plane and trying to catch up to it mid fall, put it on, and deploy it before hitting the ground
 Banzai Pipeline, a renowned Hawaiian surfing location

See also
 Bonsai (disambiguation)

Japanese-language surnames